The Roman Catholic Diocese of Salt Lake City, is a Latin diocese of the Roman Catholic Church in the United States.  Its boundaries are coterminous with the state of Utah.

Its mother church is the Cathedral of the Madeleine in Salt Lake City and it is a suffragan diocese of the Archdiocese of San Francisco.

On January 10, 2017, Pope Francis appointed Oscar Azarcon Solis, then an auxiliary bishop of Los Angeles, the 10th bishop of Salt Lake City.

Statistics and extent 
As per 2014, it pastorally served 291,000 Catholics (10.0% of 2,900,872 total) on 219,887 km² in 48 parishes with 69 priests (62 diocesan, 7 religious), 75 deacons, 43 lay religious (14 brothers, 29 sisters) and 7 seminarians.

It comprises the entire state of Utah.

History 
In 1871 Patrick Walsh built the first Catholic Church in Utah, dedicating it to Mary Magdalene. Lawrence Scanlan arrived in 1873 to become pastor. He took care of the Catholic military men, immigrant miners and railroad workers who numbered in the hundreds. Small churches, schools, an orphanage and a hospital were built, staffed by clergy and by the Sisters of the Holy Cross, to serve the growing Catholic population.
As the nineteenth century came to a close, the Catholic community in Salt Lake City was rapidly outgrowing the small church of St. Mary Magdalene.
 
In 1887 the Catholic Church in Utah became the Apostolic Vicariate of Utah, on territory split off from its metropolitan diocese, the Archdiocese of San Francisco. Ground was broken for the new church in 1899. Construction for the Cathedral of the Madeleine would last nearly a decade, costing a small fortune for the estimated 3,000 Catholics in Utah at the turn of the century. Assistance was obtained from Catholic Mission Societies.

On January 27, 1891 it was renamed the Diocese of Salt Lake and on March 27, 1931 it lost territory to establish the Diocese of Reno. Finally, on March 31, 1951 it was renamed the Diocese of Salt Lake City.

Bishops
The following includes the lists of bishops, coadjutor bishops, and auxiliary bishops of the diocese and their dates of service.

Apostolic Vicar of Salt Lake
 Lawrence Scanlan (1886-1887)

Bishops of Salt Lake
 Lawrence Scanlan (1887-1915)
 Joseph Sarsfield Glass (1915-1926)
 John Joseph Mitty (1926-1932), appointed Coadjutor Archbishop and later Archbishop of San Francisco
 James Edward Kearney (1932-1937), appointed Bishop of Rochester
 Duane Garrison Hunt (1937-1951)

Bishops of Salt Lake City
 Duane Garrison Hunt (1951-1960)
 Joseph Lennox Federal (1960-1980)
 William Kenneth Weigand (1980-1993), appointed Bishop of Sacramento
 George Hugh Niederauer (1994-2005), appointed Archbishop of San Francisco
 John Charles Wester (2007-2015), appointed Archbishop of Santa Fe
 Oscar Azarcon Solis (2017–present)

Coadjutor Bishop
 Joseph Lennox Federal (1958-1960)

Auxiliary Bishops
 Leo John Steck (1948-1950)
 Joseph Lennox Federal (1951-1958), appointed Coadjutor Bishop and later Bishop here

Other priest of this diocese who became Bishop
 Robert Joseph Dwyer, appointed Bishop of Reno in 1952

Catholic education 
The Diocese of Salt Lake City has many Catholic elementary-middle schools with its borders:
 Blessed Sacrament Catholic School, Sandy
 J.E Cosgriff Memorial Catholic School, Salt Lake City
 Kearns-Saint Ann Catholic School, South Salt Lake
 Madeleine Choir Catholic School, Salt Lake City
 Our Lady of Lourdes Catholic School, Salt Lake City
 Saint Andrew Catholic School, Riverton
 Saint Francis Xavier Catholic School, Kearns
 Saint John the Baptist Catholic Elementary School, Draper
 Saint John the Baptist Catholic Middle School, Draper
 Saint Joseph Catholic Elementary School, Ogden
 Saint Marguerite Catholic School, Tooele
 Saint Olaf Catholic School, Bountiful
 Saint Vincent de Paul Catholic School, Salt Lake City

As well, the diocese has three Catholic high schools within its borders:
 Juan Diego Catholic High School, Draper
 Judge Memorial Catholic High School, Salt Lake City
 St. Joseph Catholic High School, Ogden

Cathedral 

 Cathedral of the Madeleine, Salt Lake City Utah

Religious orders 

 Abbey of Our Lady of the Holy Trinity - Trappist Cistercian monks (closed in 2017)
Carmel of the Immaculate Heart of Mary - Carmelite Nuns
Saint Benedict Monastery & Hospital in South Ogden Utah - Sisters of St. Benedict (monastery closed and hospital sold)

See also 

 Catholic Church in the United States
 Global organisation of the Catholic Church
 List of Catholic dioceses (alphabetical)
 List of Catholic dioceses (structured view)
 List of the Catholic dioceses of the United States

References

Sources and external links 
 Roman Catholic Diocese of Salt Lake City Official Site
 GCatholic, with Google map & photo - data for most sections
 Intermountain Catholic - newspaper of the Diocese of Salt Lake City
 Map of the Diocese of Salt Lake City
Outreach programs of the Salt Lake City area ( Catholic Community Services of Utah ) 
 Archdiocese of San Francisco - official site
 

 
Roman Catholic Ecclesiastical Province of San Francisco
Religious organizations established in 1887
Roman Catholic dioceses and prelatures established in the 19th century
Roman Catholic dioceses in the United States
1887 establishments in Utah Territory